"Paperback Cliché" is a single by Irish singer Tara Blaise from her Dancing on Tables Barefoot album, released in 2005 (See 2005 in music).

The single charted at number 50 in Spain and at number 2 on Irish Airplay charts.

Track listing

CD single 
 "Paperback Cliché" (3:27)
 "A Promise" (3:30)

Remix single 
 "Paperback Cliché"
 "Paperback Cliché" (Club remix)
 "Paperback Cliché" (Album version)

2005 singles
Tara Blaise songs
2005 songs